Joseph A. "Joe" Petrarca Jr. (born April 2, 1961) was a Democratic member of the Pennsylvania House of Representatives from 1995 to 2020.

References

External links
Pennsylvania House of Representatives - Joseph Petrarca (Democrat) official PA House website
Pennsylvania House Democratic Caucus -Joseph Petrarca official Party website

Living people
Democratic Party members of the Pennsylvania House of Representatives
1961 births
21st-century American politicians